Razing Eden is the third studio album by LUXT, released on March 3, 1998 by 21st Circuitry.

Reception

Allmusic awarded Razing Eden four out of five stars, calling it "a marked improvement over their first, featuring bigger, more melodic hooks and better production that hold the listener's attention more consistently through the course of the album." Aiding & Abetting praised the album for being "drenched in noise" and "power[ing] its compositions with simple but strong beat patterns and melodic ideas". Last Sigh Magazine noted an improvement over previous material by LUXT and said it was excellent to hear the band's growth as musicians. Lollipop Magazine called the album an improvement over its predecessor and said "the engineering and mixing quality is superb and as such all the electronics, guitars, and vocals all flow smoothly together." Sonic Boom commended the band's change in stylistic direction and willingness to experiment with electronics and vocal harmonies.

Track listing

Personnel
Adapted from the Razing Eden liner notes.

LUXT
 Anna Christine – bass guitar, keyboards, sampler, vocals
 Erie Loch – guitar, keyboards, sampler, vocals, production

Additional performers
 Derek Geisser – remixing (15)
 Dave Hubbard – instruments
 Gregory A. Lopez – remixing (15)
 Phil Mohr – instruments, remixing (2)
 Michael Tapson – remixing (15)

Release history

References

External links 
 

1998 albums
21st Circuitry albums
LUXT albums